The 2018–19 Regionalliga is the eleventh season of the Regionalliga, the seventh under the new format, as the fourth tier of the German football league system.

Format
A new promotion format was used this season. The champions of the Regionalliga Nordost and Südwest were promoted directly to the 2019–20 3. Liga, as well as the champion of a third league determined in a draw. The other two champions participated in the promotion play-offs to determine the fourth promoted team.

The draw to determine which league got the final direct promotion spot (Bayern, Nord or West), along with the pairing order of the promotion play-offs took place on 27 April 2018.

Regionalliga Nord
18 teams from the states of Bremen, Hamburg, Lower Saxony and Schleswig-Holstein competed in the seventh season of the reformed Regionalliga Nord. Werder Bremen II was relegated from the 2017–18 3. Liga. Lupo Martini Wolfsburg and VfL Oldenburg were promoted from the 2017–18 Niedersachsenliga and Holstein Kiel II was promoted from the 2017–18 Schleswig-Holstein-Liga.

The relegation process was reformed for this season. The regular scenario saw the bottom three clubs relegated. They were replaced by the champions of the Niedersachsenliga, while the champions of the Bremen-Liga, Oberliga Hamburg and Schleswig-Holstein-Liga played a round-robin play-off for the remaining two places. The fifteenth-placed club played off against the Oberliga Niedersachsen runners-up for a final place in the Regionalliga. This scenario varied depending on promotion to and relegation from the 3. Liga.

Relegation play-offs

|}

Regionalliga Nordost
18 teams from the states of Berlin, Brandenburg, Mecklenburg-Vorpommern, Saxony, Saxony-Anhalt and Thuringia competed in the seventh season of the reformed Regionalliga Nordost. Chemnitzer FC and Rot-Weiß Erfurt were relegated from the 2017–18 3. Liga. Optik Rathenow was promoted from the 2017–18 NOFV-Oberliga Nord and Bischofswerdaer FV was promoted from the 2017–18 NOFV-Oberliga Süd.

Regionalliga West
18 teams from North Rhine-Westphalia competed in the seventh season of the reformed Regionalliga West. TV Herkenrath was promoted from the 2017–18 Mittelrheinliga, SV Straelen was promoted from the 2017–18 Oberliga Niederrhein and SV Lippstadt and 1. FC Kaan-Marienborn were promoted from the 2017–18 Oberliga Westfalen.

Westphalian DFB-Pokal play-off
As the Westphalian Football and Athletics Association is one of three regional associations with the most participating teams in their league competitions, they are allowed to enter a second team for the 2019–20 DFB-Pokal (in addition to the Westphalian Cup winners). A play-off took place between the best-placed eligible (non-reserve) Westphalian team of the Regionalliga West and the best-placed eligible team of the Oberliga Westfalen, with the winners qualifying for the DFB-Pokal.

Regionalliga Südwest
18 teams from Baden-Württemberg, Hesse, Rhineland-Palatinate and Saarland competed in the seventh season of the Regionalliga Südwest. FC 08 Homburg and FK Pirmasens were promoted from the 2017–18 Oberliga Rheinland-Pfalz/Saar, TSG Balingen was promoted from the 2017–18 Oberliga Baden-Württemberg and Hessen Dreieich was promoted from the 2017–18 Hessenliga.

Regionalliga Bayern
18 teams from Bavaria competed in the seventh season of the Regionalliga Bayern. SV Heimstetten was promoted from the 2017–18 Bayernliga Süd and Viktoria Aschaffenburg was promoted from the 2017–18 Bayernliga Nord.

Relegation play-offs

First round

|}

Second round
Since Bayern Munich II were promoted to the 3. Liga, the losers from the first round played for another Regionalliga spot.

|}

Promotion play-offs
The participants and pairing order for the 2018–19 promotion play-offs was determined by a draw held on 27 April 2018. The first leg was played on 22 May and the second leg on 26 May 2019.

All times Central European Summer Time (UTC+2)

Bayern Munich II won 5–4 on aggregate.

References

External links
 Regionalliga   DFB.de
 Regionalliga Nord  nordfv.de
 Regionalliga West  wdfv.de
 Regionalliga Bayern  bfv.de

2018-19
4
2018–19 in European fourth tier association football leagues